And the Sea Will Tell is a true crime book by Vincent Bugliosi and Bruce Henderson. The nonfiction book recounts a double murder on Palmyra Atoll; the subsequent arrest, trial and conviction of Duane ("Buck") Walker; and the acquittal of his girlfriend, Stephanie Stearns, whom Bugliosi and Leonard Weinglass defended. The book went to No. 1 on The New York Times hardcover bestseller list in March 1991 and is still in print as a trade paperback and ebook.

The killings

In 1974, a wealthy couple from San Diego, California,  Malcolm "Mac" Graham III, 43, and Eleanor LaVerne "Muff" Graham, 40, sailed their 38-foot ketch, Sea Wind, to Palmyra Atoll — 1,200 miles south of Honolulu — hoping to find it deserted and to spend a year or more there. They found other sailors already there, including two male Canadian scientists, but nonetheless stayed.

Also on Palmyra were Wesley G. Walker (a.k.a. Buck Walker) and Stephanie Stearns (referred to as "Jennifer Jenkins" in the book), who had sailed there together from Hawaii on Stearns's sailing vessel Iola, a deteriorating, patched-together wooden sloop that lacked a reliable auxiliary engine. In contrast, the Grahams' ketch, the Sea Wind, was beautifully finished and impeccably outfitted, with an onboard machine shop equipped with a lathe and acetylene welding torch.

Walker was an ex-convict fleeing a drug possession charge and had come up with the idea of growing cannabis on Palmyra to support himself.  The Grahams were a happily married couple touring the world, and Mr. Graham ran his business remotely.  The Grahams had brought more than a year's supply of food for their voyage, but Walker and Stearns quickly consumed their own meager supplies and resorted to harvesting the island's few coconuts, often by chopping down entire trees, leaving scars on the island habitat. As Walker's method of farming became unsustainable, he and Stearns were forced to plan a voyage in the rickety Iola, against prevailing winds and currents, to Fanning (Tabuaeran), a nearby atoll in Kiribati, to restock — a voyage close to impossible without a working auxiliary engine.

According to Stearns, the Grahams disappeared sometime between August 28 and August 30, 1974, and the young couple found the Grahams' Zodiac rigid inflatable dinghy upside down. On September 11, 1974, after days of searching and waiting for the Grahams to return to their boat, Stearns said she and Walker scuttled the Iola and sailed for Hawaii on the Sea Wind. Once in Hawaii, the couple had the Sea Wind repainted and also renamed it, which according to boating superstition brings bad luck. This act aroused suspicion; acquaintances of the Grahams easily recognized the distinctive Sea Wind despite its new paint job. Stearns was arrested in the lower level of the Hawaii Yacht Club for the theft of the Sea Wind, but Walker was able to escape and avoid capture by using a motorized dinghy to race up the "400 row" of the Ala Wai Harbor.  It was believed he fled on foot after leaving the dinghy at the loading dock near the Ilikai Hotel.

In 1981, other visitors to Palmyra found Muff Graham's skeletal remains, which showed signs of dismemberment and burning (possibly by Mac Graham's acetylene welding torch) and appeared to have been concealed underwater in a large metal container.

Trial and punishment

Buck Walker was tried and convicted of Muff Graham's murder. He was incarcerated at United States Penitentiary, Victorville, in California.  Although Walker never testified, the defense claimed that he and Stearns were attempting to return the Sea Wind to Hawaii with the Iola in tow, but the Iola ran aground on the reef as they exited the lagoon and had to be abandoned.  During the voyage back to Hawaii, it was claimed that a large swordfish damaged the Sea Winds hull below the waterline, necessitating her repair and subsequent repainting and renaming.

Stephanie Stearns was tried separately in the United States District Court for the Northern District of California in San Francisco. After Bugliosi argued that Buck Walker had committed the Palmyra murders himself without Stearns's participation or knowledge, and following her testimony at the trial, the jury returned a verdict of not guilty.

Aftermath

The book was adapted into the 1991 television film And the Sea Will Tell, directed by Tommy Lee Wallace which aired on CBS as a 4-hour film. Part 1 aired on February 24, and Part 2 was aired two days later.

The trial lawyer who represented Walker, Earle Partington, sued Bugliosi for defamation, claiming that both the book and the docudrama portrayed Partington in a negative light. The court found for Bugliosi, ruling that this was his protected opinion.

Walker was released on parole in September 2007 at the age of 69, after serving 22 years of a life sentence, and died of a stroke on April 26, 2010 at the age of 72.  Prior to his death, Walker had been living in a trailer home in Willits, California.  Walker (writing as Wesley G. Walker) claimed in a book about that case that he had been seduced by Mrs. Graham and, in the midst of lovemaking, had been caught by Mr. Graham, who shot his wife and attempted to shoot Walker.

Malcolm Graham's body has never been found.

References

External links

BruceHendersonBooks.com - co-author Bruce Henderson's website

1991 non-fiction books
American people murdered abroad
Non-fiction books about murders in the United States
Palmyra Atoll
Books by Vincent Bugliosi
Non-fiction books adapted into films
Collaborative non-fiction books